The second season of Kaguya-sama: Love Is War, titled Kaguya-sama: Love Is War?, is a 2020 Japanese anime series, based on the manga series of the same title, written and illustrated by Aka Akasaka. It was announced on October 19, 2019. The staff and cast returned to reprise their roles. The season premiered from April 11 to June 27, 2020 on the same Japanese stations as the first, though its world premiere took place prior to Japanese broadcast at Anime Festival Sydney on March 8, 2020. As theme music, the season uses Suzuki's "Daddy! Daddy! Do! feat. Airi Suzuki" as the opening theme while using Haruka Fukuhara's "Kaze ni Fukarete" (lit. "Blown by the Wind") as the ending theme.


Episode list

References

Kaguya-sama: Love Is War episode lists
2020 Japanese television seasons